Jovan Uroš Nemanjić ( / Jovan Uroš Nemanjić) or John Ouresis Doukas Palaiologos or Joasaph of Meteora (Iōannēs Ouresēs Doúkas Palaiologos), was the ruler of Thessaly from c. 1370 to c. 1373, retiring as a monk for the next half century thereafter. He died in 1422 or 1423.

Life 
John Uroš was the son of Emperor Simeon Uroš Nemanjic by Thomais Orsini. He was born in 1350 and died in 1422. His maternal grandparents were John II Orsini and Anna Palaiologina.

Between 1369 and 1372 he succeeded his father as titular emperor of the Serbians and Greeks, although his rule was limited to Thessaly. He may have been associated on the throne by his father as early as 1359/60.  After reigning for an uncertain number of years, John Uroš abdicated in favour of his relative, the Caesar Alexios Angelos Philanthropenos, and became a monk.

He joined the monastic community founded by his father at Meteora, where he is documented under his monastic name Joasaph in 1381.  Although he had surrendered political power, John Uroš remained wealthy and influential. In 1384–1385 he helped his sister Maria govern Epirus after the murder of her husband Thomas II Preljubović. He endowed the monasteries at Meteora and eventually became the head of the local monastic community, rebuilding or establishing further monasteries in the area in 1388 and 1390. In the 1390s he visited Mount Athos, but was back in Meteora by 1401, and died there in 1422 or 1423.

John Uroš was the last emperor of Serbs and Greeks and the last Serbian ruler of Thessaly. His relative Alexios Angelos Philanthropenos succeeded him and recognized Byzantine suzerainty, and the area was lost to Bayezid I of the Ottoman Empire by his son Manuel Angelos Philanthropenos in 1394. John Uroš had a younger brother named Stefan Uroš, ruler of Pharsalus (sons of Simeon Uroš), who may have held Pharsalos as his fief. Although he died long after his brother became monk, he did not succeed him as ruler of Thessaly.

Family

John Uroš married a daughter of Radoslav Hlapen, a Serbian lord in Macedonia. According to the manuscript Dell'Imperadori Constantinopolitani, preserved in the papers of Angelo Masarelli, the father of John's wife was "lord of Drima" ("l Signor Drimi"). John had five children:

Constantine (Konstantin)
Michael (Mihajlo)
Demetrios (Dimitrije)
Helena (Jelena) Ouresina Palaiologina, who married Theodore Kantakouzenos, with whom she had Irene Kantakouzene
Asanina

Ancestry

References

Sources
Nicolas Cheetham, Mediaeval Greece, Yale University Press, 1981.
 
 
 
 Brook, Lindsay L (1989): "The problematic ascent of Eirene Kantakouzene Brankovic", Studies in Genealogy and Family History in Tribute to Charles Evans, published in Salt Lake City 1989
 

14th-century Serbian royalty
14th-century Byzantine people
15th-century Byzantine people
Medieval rulers of Thessaly
14th-century births
1422 deaths
Eastern Orthodox royal saints
14th-century Eastern Orthodox Christians
15th-century Eastern Orthodox Christians
Medieval Serbian people of Greek descent
Serbian saints of the Eastern Orthodox Church
Nemanjić dynasty
15th-century Christian monks
Sons of emperors
Self-proclaimed monarchy